Eugene Robert La Rocque (June 29, 1918 – October 31, 2016) was a rear admiral of the US Navy. He founded the Center for Defense Information in 1971.

Early life
La Rocque was born in Kankakee, Illinois, in 1918 and began his naval service in 1940. When the attack on Pearl Harbor was carried out, he was serving on the USS Macdonough. He participated in 13 major battles during World War II and worked for seven years in the Strategic Plans Directorate of the Joint Chiefs of Staff. In the Battle of Kwajalein, he was the first man to go ashore in the landings at Roi-Namur.

As a lieutenant commander, La Rocque was the commanding officer of USS Solar, destroyed on April 30, 1946, in an explosion in loading torpex at Naval Ammunition Depot, Earle (now Naval Weapons Station, Earle), New Jersey. Five enlisted men and one officer were killed with 125 others wounded.

Activism
He retired in 1972 and was disillusioned over the Vietnam War. La Rocque and his colleagues testified before the US Congress, frequently appeared in the media, and consulted many national and international political leaders.

In the 1980s, La Rocque founded a weekly public affairs television program, America's Defense Monitor. In 1974, he stated that in his experience, any ship that is capable of carrying nuclear weapons carries them and does not off-load them in foreign ports. That statement directly conflicted with the US Department of Defense's policy that it would "neither confirm nor deny" (NC/ND) on such weapons and sparked controversy in Japan, which has had a non-nuclear policy since World War II.

He was elected to the Common Cause National Governing Board in 1982.

Personal life
La Rocque had three children (John La Rocque, James La Rocque, and Annette La Rocque Fitzsimmons) with Sally Fox, whom he had been married 32 years before her death, in 1978. In 1980, he married Washington businesswoman Lillian Kerekes Danchik, who died in 1994, which left his two stepsons (Howard and Roger Danchik) from her first marriage.

Death
La Rocque died in Washington, DC, at the age of 98. He is buried at Arlington National Cemetery.

See also 
 Center for Defense Information

References

External links
 "Profiles: Gene Robert La Rocque," by Herbert Mitang, New Yorker, October 6, 1986.
 "Admiral Gene Larocque Speaks to Studs Terkel About "The Good War", 1985.

1918 births
2016 deaths
People from Kankakee, Illinois
Military personnel from Illinois
United States Navy admirals
Burials at Arlington National Cemetery